Narta may refer to:
 Narta, Croatia, village in Bjelovar-Bilogora County, Croatia
Nartë, also known as Narta, village near Vlorë, Albania
Narta Lagoon, lagoon in Albania near Nartë